This is a list of Maltese governments from the creation of the first self-Government of Malta in 1921.

References

Malta
Politics of Malta
Governments